is a Japanese manga series written and illustrated by Kazuo Umezu. It was serialized in Shogakukan's Weekly Shōnen Sunday from June 1969 to August 1970. It follows the story of Orochi, a woman with a young appearance and supernatural powers and how she observes people's lives and the consequences of their hidden actions. The story contains several varying elements such as paranormal and psychological themes.

In 2008, It was adapted into a live action film.

In North America, it was licensed for an English language release by Viz Media.

Characters
Kazusa Monzen (played by Yoshino Kimura)
Risa Monzen (played by Noriko Nakagoshi)
Aoi Monzen (played by Yoshino Kimura)
Orochi (played by Mitsuki Tanimura)

Manga
Orochi was serialized in Shogakukan's Weekly Shōnen Sunday from June 15, 1969, to August 23, 1970. Akita Shoten collected its chapters into six tankōbon volumes, released between April 23 and September 23, 1971. In 2005, Shogakukan re-released the series into four-volume deluxe edition.

In North America, the manga was licensed for English release by Viz Media. Only one volume was published on September 5, 2002. In July 2021, Viz Media announced that they would re-publish the series in print and digital formats. The first volume was released on March 15, 2022.

References

External links

 
Reviews at Twitch Film:  

Akita Shoten manga
Horror anime and manga
Kazuo Umezu
Live-action films based on manga
Manga adapted into films
Shogakukan manga
Shōnen manga
Supernatural thriller anime and manga
Viz Media manga
Japanese horror films